The Telescopio InfraRosso del Gornergrat (TIRGO), or the Gornergrat Infrared Telescope, was located on the northern tower of the Kulm Hotel at Gornergrat ( altitude) near Zermatt, Switzerland. It was a  Cassegrain telescope with a tip-tilt correcting secondary and optimized for infrared observations, but was decommissioned in March 2005. The telescope and related instrumentation were run by the Istituto di Radioastronomia (IRA - C.N.R.), sezione di Firenze (former CAISMI), with the assistance of the Osservatorio Astrofisico di Arcetri and the Dipartimento di Astronomia e Scienza dello Spazio of the University of Florence.

See also
List of largest optical telescopes in the 20th century
List of largest infrared telescopes

Infrared telescopes